This article is a summary of the literary events and publications of 1631.

Events
January 9 – Love's Triumph Through Callipolis, a masque written by Ben Jonson and designed by Inigo Jones, is staged at Whitehall Palace.
January 11 – The Master of the Revels in England refuses to license Philip Massinger's new play, Believe as You List, because of its seditious content; it is first performed in a revised version on May 7.
February 5 – Puritan minister and theologian Roger Williams emigrates from England to Boston in the Massachusetts Bay Colony.
February 22 – Chloridia, the year's second Jonson/Jones masque, is performed.
June 10 – The King's Men perform Pericles, Prince of Tyre (c.1607/8) at the Globe Theatre.
The young Blaise Pascal moves with his family to Paris.
Thomas Hobbes is employed as a tutor by the Cavendish family, to teach the future Earl of Devonshire.
Publication of the "Wicked Bible" by Robert Barker and Martin Lucas, the royal printers in London, an edition of the King James Version of the Bible in which a typesetting erratum leaves the seventh of the Ten Commandments with the word not omitted from the sentence "Thou shalt not commit adultery". Copies are withdrawn and about a year later the publishers are called to the Star Chamber, fined £300 and have their licence to print revoked.

New books

Prose
Johann Philipp Abelin – Arma Suecica, volume 1
Moses Amyraut – Traité des religions
Collected works of Jacobus Arminius published posthumously in Frankfurt
Robert Fludd – Medicina Catholica (Volume 2)
Thomas Harriot – Artis analyticae praxis
James Mabbe – Celestina, or the Tragicomedy of Calisto and Melibea, a 300-page closet drama or "novel in dialogue," translated from the Spanish-language original of Fernando de Rojas, La Celestina (1499)
Wicked Bible, a reprint of the King James Bible notable for typographical errors
William Oughtred – Clavis mathematicae

Drama
Anonymous – Fair Em published
George Chapman – Caesar and Pompey published
Henry Chettle – Hoffman published
Lope de Vega
Punishment without Revenge (El castigo sin venganza)
La noche de San Juan
Thomas Goffe – The Raging Turk published
Peter Hausted – Senile Odium
Thomas Heywood – The Fair Maid of the West, Parts 1 and 2 (published; probably performed in the previous year)
Ben Jonson
Chloridia (masque)
Love's Triumph Through Callipolis (masque)
Ralph Knevet – Rhodon and Iris (masque)
James Mabbe – The Spanish Bawd published
Jean Mairet – La Silvanire, ou la Morte-vive
Shackerley Marmion – Holland's Leaguer runs for a highly unusual six straight performances
John Marston, with William Barkstead & Lewis Machin (?) – The Insatiate Countess published
Philip Massinger
Believe as You List
The Emperor of the East
Thomas May – Antigone, the Theban Princess published
Jean Rotrou – L'Hypocondriaque
James Shirley
The Traitor
Love's Cruelty
The Humorous Courtier
Love Tricks published as The School of Compliment
Aurelian Townshend – Albion's Triumph (masque)
Robert Ward (?) – Fucus Histriomastix
Arthur Wilson – The Swisser
Richard Zouche – The Sophister

Poetry

Richard Braithwait – The English Gentleman

Births
January 1 – Katharine Philips (Orinda), English poet (died 1664)
February 22 – Peder Syv, Danish philologist, folklorist and priest (died 1702)
March 16 – René Le Bossu, French critic (died 1680)
April – John Phillips, English satirist and nephew of John Milton (died 1706)
July 15 – Richard Cumberland, English philosopher (died 1718)
August 9 – John Dryden, English poet and dramatist (died 1700)
October 18 – Michael Wigglesworth, English-born American poet and minister (died 1705)
Unknown date – John Barret, English religious writer and Presbyterian minister (died 1713)

Deaths
February 7 – Gabriel Harvey, English poet and author (born c. 1545)
March 31 – John Donne, English poet and Dean of St Paul's (born 1572)
May 6 – Robert Bruce Cotton, English antiquary and founder of Cotton Library (born 1570)
May 25 – Samuel Harsnett, English religious writer and archbishop (born 1561)
May 26 – Enrico Caterino Davila, Italian historian, murdered (born 1576)
July 28 – Guillén de Castro y Bellvis, Spanish dramatist (born 1569)
September 22 – Cardinal Federico Borromeo, Italian archbishop and founder of Biblioteca Ambrosiana (born 1564)
October 26 – Lewis Bayly, Welsh or Scottish-born religious writer and bishop writing in English (unknown year of birth)
November 29 – Edmond Richer, French theologian (born 1559)
December 23 – Michael Drayton, English poet (born 1563)

References

 
Years of the 17th century in literature